KK Crvena zvezda history and statistics in FIBA Europe and Euroleague Basketball (company) competitions.

European competitions

Record
Crvena zvezda has overall, from 1960 to 1970 (first participation) to 2015–16 (last participation): 201 wins against 180 defeats plus 2 draws in 383 games for all the European club competitions.

 EuroLeague: 42–73 (115)
 FIBA Saporta Cup: 29–22 (51) /// EuroCup Basketball: 62–48 plus 2 (112)
 FIBA Korać Cup: 68–37 (105)

External links
FIBA Europe
EuroLeague
ULEB
EuroCup

 
Crvena zvezda